Doom & Sons was a former attraction in the Talbot Street area of Alton Towers theme park, Staffordshire, England. The attraction was opened in 1981 and was Alton Towers's first haunted attraction. It was a walk-through with illusions, interactive features and sensory effects.

Doom & Sons closed in 1991, to be superseded by the new Haunted House the following year.

External links
Doom & Sons at Alton Towers Almanac

Tourist attractions in Staffordshire
Removed amusement attractions
Amusement rides introduced in 1981
Amusement rides that closed in 1991
Alton Towers